Silent Witness is a British crime drama TV series.

Silent Witness may also refer to:

Film
 A Silent Witness, lost 1912 Australian silent film
 The Silent Witness (1917 film), an American film starring Gertrude McCoy
 The Silent Witness (1932 film), an American mystery film directed by Marcel Varnel
 The Silent Witness (1962 film), an American drama film
 Silent Witness (1943 film), an American film
 Silent Witness (1985 film), an American television film starring Valerie Bertinelli and John Savage 
 Silent Witness (1994 film), a Canadian documentary film by Harriet Wichin
 Silent Witness (1999 film), an American film starring William Hurt and Jennifer Tilly
 Silent Witness (2013 film), Chinese crime thriller
 Heart Blackened, a 2017 South Korean remake of the 2013 Chinese film

Other uses
 Silent Witness (horse) (born 1999), Thoroughbred racehorse
 A Silent Witness, a 1914 detective novel by R. Austin Freeman
 Silent Witness, a 1976 novel by Susan Yankowitz
 Silent Witness, album by Jeff & Sheri Easter